Acanthoxia   is a genus of African grasshoppers in the family Acrididae.

Pretoriana is a synonym. The tachinid fly genus invalidly named thus by Curran in 1938 is now Gautengicesa. The moth genus invalidly named thus by Traugott-Olsen in 1995 is now considered a junior synonym of Perittia.

Species
Acanthoxia aculeus Grunshaw, 1996
Acanthoxia brevipenne Grunshaw, 1996
Acanthoxia gladiator Westwood, 1841
Acanthoxia lanceolata Bolívar, 1890
Acanthoxia natalensis Krauss, 1877
Acanthoxia pretoriae Miller, 1932

References

External links 

Acrididae genera
Caelifera